Stephen Michael Elonka (died 1983) was the author of numerous technical books, including Standard Plant Operators' Manual. He also wrote a book of the adventures of one Marmaduke Surfaceblow, a fictional engineer who solves difficult problems in ingeniously simple ways. POWER Magazine's  Marmaduke Awards were named for this character.  Books by Elonka have been translated into Spanish, Portuguese, and Chinese.

Notes

Year of birth missing
1983 deaths